Battle of Ochmatów can refer to:
Battle of Ochmatów (1644), a battle between the Polish-Lithuanian Commonwealth and a horde of Crimean Tatars
Battle of Ochmatów (1655), a battle between the Polish-Lithuanian Commonwealth and Russian Tsardom